The United States Post Office and Courthouse is a historic building in Downtown Columbus, Ohio. The structure was built from 1884 to 1887 as the city's main post office. The building also served as a courthouse of the United States District Court for the Southern District of Ohio from its completion in 1887 until 1934, when the court moved to the Joseph P. Kinneary United States Courthouse. The building was tripled in size from 1907 to 1912, and was rehabilitated for use as the Bricker & Eckler law offices in 1986, and today houses the same law firm.

The building was listed on the National Register of Historic Places in 1973 and the Columbus Register of Historic Properties in 1982.

Attributes
It is a three-and-a-half-story building, originally designed in the Romanesque Revival style by John T. Harris. It was expanded to three times its original size from 1907 to 1912, in a thorough process that unified old and new portions in the High Victorian Gothic style; the architect of record was James Knox Taylor. The building utilizes tan rock-faced Berea sandstone, with trim of smooth sandstone. The building has round-arched windows topped with heavy hoodmolds, and projecting stone bands between its floors. The 1900s addition was built to the south of the original structure, using the same type of stone. New elements added include pointed arches, buttresses, and Gothic ornamentation. The building has a red tile roof, replacing an original slate roof.

History
The structure was built from 1884 to 1887 as the city's main post office. The building also served as a courthouse of the United States District Court for the Southern District of Ohio from its completion in 1887 until 1934, when the court moved to the Joseph P. Kinneary United States Courthouse. Federal offices and the post office moved to the Bricker Federal Building around 1977. The building was rehabilitated for use as the Bricker & Eckler law offices in 1986, designed by Böhm-NBBJ, and today houses the same law firm.

The building was listed on the National Register of Historic Places in 1973 and the Columbus Register of Historic Properties in 1982.

Gallery

See also
 List of United States federal courthouses in Ohio
 National Register of Historic Places listings in Columbus, Ohio

References

External links
 

Buildings in downtown Columbus, Ohio
Columbus Register properties
Columbus
Columbus
Former federal courthouses in the United States
Government buildings completed in 1887
Government buildings in Columbus, Ohio
National Register of Historic Places in Columbus, Ohio
Post office buildings in Ohio
Columbus
Federal buildings in the United States